Tiff Eden (born 16 October 1994) is an English rugby union player, currently playing for United Rugby Championship side Zebre Parma. His preferred position is fly-half.

Career
He joined Nottingham permanently in 2017, spending a season with them, before joining .

References

External links
itsrugby profile

Living people
English rugby union players
Worcester Warriors players
Nottingham R.F.C. players
Bristol Bears players
Hartpury University R.F.C. players
Zebre Parma players
Rugby union fly-halves
1994 births
Rugby union players from Cheltenham